"Freak" is a song by American singer and rapper Doja Cat released through Kemosabe Records and RCA Records on August 7, 2020. Originally uploaded exclusively to SoundCloud in 2018, it was repackaged and released commercially due to popular demand by fans online. The single samples the 1959 song, "Put Your Head on My Shoulder" by Paul Anka. A standalone promotional single, "Freak" received a limited vinyl release via Urban Outfitters in November 2020.

Background and release 
Prior to its re-release, "Freak" had gained popularity on the video-sharing platform TikTok, where it had been used in over 1.2 million videos. In late June 2020, Doja Cat teased multiple new songs on an Instagram live which she stated would all be released together in an upcoming project. Alongside the announcement of "Freak", Doja Cat wrote that she had released the song in order to hold her fans off while she works on "a new surprise." Both a clean and explicit version were released digitally. In November 2020, a limited edition vinyl release of the song was made available exclusively through Urban Outfitters in order to support 11/11 Singles Day.

Credits and personnel
Recording and management
 Engineered at Lineage Studios (Los Angeles, California)
 Vocals Recorded at The Sound Factory (Los Angeles, California)
 Mastered at Bernie Grundman Mastering (Hollywood, California)
 Doja Cat Music/Prescription Songs (BMI), Yeti Yeti Yeti/WB Music Corp. (ASCAP), Cameron Bartolini Music (ASCAP), EPA Publishing/PW Ballads/Songs of Universal, Inc. (BMI), Chrysalis Standards, Inc./BMG Rights Management (BMI), Universal Music - Careers (BMI), EMI Blackwood Music, Inc. (BMI), Waters of Nazareth Publishing/Warner Geo Met Ric Music (GMR)
 Contains a sample from “Put Your Head on My Shoulder”, words and music by Paul Anka, published by EPA Publishing/PW Ballads/Songs of Universal, Inc. (BMI) and 1938 (Renewed 1986) Chrysalis Standards, Inc./BMG Rights Management (BMI)/BMG Blue (BMII) administers 100% for the World ex USA obo Paul Anka/Chrysalis Standards, Inc. (BMI), used courtesy of Paul Anka Productions, by arrangement with Primary Wave Music
 Contains a portion of the composition “Milkshake”, written by Chad Hugo and Pharrell Williams, published by Universal Music - Careers (BMI), EMI Blackwood Music, Inc. (BMI) and Waters of Nazareth Publishing/Warner Geo Met Ric Music (GMR)

Personnel

Doja Cat – vocals, songwriting, production
Cameron Bartolini – songwriting; production, engineering 
David Sprecher – songwriting; additional production, engineering 
Paul Anka – songwriting
Chad Hugo – songwriting
Pharrell Williams – songwriting
Neal H Pogue – mixing 
Mike Bozzi – mastering

Credits adapted from "Freak" vinyl liner notes.

Charts

Certifications

Release history

References 

Doja Cat songs
2020 singles
2018 songs
Songs written by Paul Anka
Songs written by Doja Cat
Songs written by Yeti Beats
Songs written by Chad Hugo
Songs written by Pharrell Williams
Songs written by Omarion